House of Spoils is an upcoming American supernatural horror film written and directed by Bridget Savage Cole and Danielle Krudy. It stars Ariana DeBose, Barbie Ferreira and Arian Moayed. It is produced by Jason Blum under his Blumhouse Television banner, Adam Hendricks and Greg Gilreath under their Divide/Conquer banner, and Drew Houpt, Alex Scharfman and Lucas Joaquin under their Secret Engine banner.

Plot 
A chef opens her first restaurant where she battles kitchen chaos, a dubious investor, crushing self-doubts and the powerful spirit of the estate's previous owner who threatens to sabotage her at every turn.

Cast 
 Ariana DeBose
 Barbie Ferreira 
 Arian Moayed
 Gabe Drake

Production 
In August 2022, Amazon Studios and Blumhouse Television announced House of Spoils which is being written and directed by Bridget Savage Cole and Danielle Krudy with Ariana DeBose, Barbie Ferreira and Arian Moayed set to star.

Filming
Principal photography on the film began in August 2022 in Hungary.

Release
House of Spoils is set to be released by Amazon Studios.

References

External links 
 

Upcoming films
Upcoming English-language films
American supernatural horror films
Blumhouse Productions films
Films produced by Jason Blum
Amazon Prime Video original films
2020s American films